Hamacarus was Bishop of Utrecht from around 790 to 806.

From Hamacarus nothing is known except that he was a bishop of Utrecht.

External links
C. Dekker, Geschiedenis van de provincie Utrecht (Utrecht, 1997)

Bishops of Utrecht
8th-century Frankish bishops
806 deaths